The 1883 Atlantic hurricane season ran through the summer and the first half of fall in 1883. This is the period of each year when most tropical cyclones form in the Atlantic basin. In the 1883 Atlantic season there was one tropical storm, one Category 1 hurricane, and two major hurricanes (Category 3+). However, in the absence of modern satellite monitoring and remote-sensing technologies, only storms that affected populated land areas or encountered ships at sea were recorded, so the actual total could be higher. An undercount bias of zero to six tropical cyclones per year between 1851 and 1885 and zero to four per year between 1886 and 1910 has been estimated.



Season summary 
The Atlantic hurricane database (HURDAT) recognizes four tropical cyclones for the 1883 season. In 1883 there was one tropical storm, one Category 1 hurricane and two major hurricanes in the Atlantic basin. Due to the inactivity of the season, there were no storms in June, July or November. Both Hurricane One and Hurricane Two were active in the Western Atlantic throughout the second half of August. Although Hurricane One was the only storm of the year not to make a landfall, it did cause 80 deaths among seafarers off Newfoundland. Hurricane Three was a major hurricane that was first seen in the Lesser Antilles and travelled north to eventually dissipate over Virginia. It caused 106 deaths in the Bahamas and North Carolina. The last known cyclone was a tropical storm active in October between the Bahamas and the coast of North Carolina.

Timeline

Systems

Hurricane One 

A tropical storm was first seen on August 18 in the tropical Atlantic. It moved to the west-northwest, becoming a hurricane before turning to the northeast. It moved past Newfoundland on August 26.
The hurricane caused 80 deaths from swells in the Newfoundland area.

Hurricane Two 

A hurricane was first seen on August 24 to the northeast of the Lesser Antilles. Resembling a Cape Verde-type hurricane, it moved to the northwest, and reached major hurricane status on the 28th. It passed south of the Canadian Maritimes, and became extratropical on August 30 to the east of Newfoundland. The extratropical storm persisted until September 2 when it lost its identity over East Anglia.

Hurricane Three 

The Bahamas-North Carolina Hurricane of 1883

A major hurricane moved through the Lesser Antilles on September 4. It crossed Hispaniola, weakening to a minimal hurricane. It restrengthened as it passed the Bahamas, and struck North Carolina as a Category 2 hurricane on the 11th. It dissipated over Virginia on September 13.
Across North Carolina trees were uprooted and fences, light buildings, telegraph and telephone lines blown down . Several vessels were wrecked off the North Carolina coast and flooding occurred along the Cape Fear River. In Virginia the rains from this storm helped end a summer-long drought but any benefit was minimal, as the peanut crop had already failed from the lack of rain. At Nottoway, Virginia, heavy rain from the cyclone may have led to a train with 10 freight cars derailing.
Overall the hurricane caused 106 deaths in the Bahamas and North Carolina.

Tropical Storm Four 

A tropical storm formed on October 22 over the Bahamas. It moved to the north, then turned to the northeast while off the North Carolina coastline. As an extratropical cyclone it strengthened to an  storm before dissipating.

See also 

 List of notable tropical cyclones
 Atlantic hurricane season
 Tropical cyclone observation
 Atlantic hurricane reanalysis project

References

External links 
 1883 Monthly Weather Review
 1883 AHS at HURDAT
 1883 Hurricane/Tropical Data for Atlantic

 
Atlantic Hurricane Season, 1883
Articles which contain graphical timelines
1883 natural disasters